Roseovarius tolerans is a species of bacteria, the type species of its genus. It is a budding bacterium with variable bacteriochlorophyll a production. It is Gram-negative, aerobic, contains storage granules and can be motile. The type strain is EL-172T (= DSM 11457T).

References

Further reading
Whitman, William B., et al., eds. Bergey's manual® of systematic bacteriology. Vol. 5. Springer, 2012.

External links
LPSN

Type strain of Roseovarius tolerans at BacDive -  the Bacterial Diversity Metadatabase

Rhodobacteraceae
Bacteria described in 1999